Bonnie Doon is a coastal rural locality in the Shire of Douglas, Queensland, Australia.

Geography 
Bonnie Doon is bounded to the north by the Mossman River, to the east by the Coral Sea, and to the south by the Captain Cook Highway. The South Mossman River and its tributary Cassowary Creek flow from the south and, after, their confluence, the South Mossman River becomes the north-western boundary of the locality, until its confluence with the Mossman River.

History 
In October 1878, William Henry Buchanan selected 400 acres of land on the south bank of the Mossman River, calling it Bonnie Doon.

On 22 October 1886, the murder of William Thompson by his wife Ellen Thompson and her lover John Harrison, a worker at Bonnie Doon resulted in both of them being hanged at Boggo Road Gaol in Brisbane on 13 June 1887. Ellen Thompson was the only woman ever hanged in Queensland.

On 23 August 1897, the sugarcane from Bonnie Doon was the first to be crushed at the Mossman Sugar Mill.

Bonnie Doon Provisional School opened about January 1915 as a half time school, sharing a teacher with Hutton Park Provisional School. They both closed about August 1922.

Education 
There are no schools in Bonnie Doon, but there are primary and secondary schools in neighbouring Mossman.

References 

Shire of Douglas
Coastline of Queensland
Localities in Queensland